Franz Heck (6 February 1899 in Gilsdorf – 8 January 1977 in Cannes) was a Luxembourgish racing cyclist. He won the Luxembourgish National Road Race Championships in 1922.

References

1899 births
1977 deaths
Luxembourgian male cyclists
People from Diekirch (canton)